Richard Leonard Adelman (born June 16, 1946) is an American former professional basketball player and coach. He coached 23 seasons in the National Basketball Association (NBA). Adelman served as head coach of the Portland Trail Blazers, Golden State Warriors, Sacramento Kings, Houston Rockets and Minnesota Timberwolves. He was inducted into the Naismith Basketball Hall of Fame in the class of 2021.

Early life and playing career

Adelman was born in Lynwood, California, the son of Gladys (née Olsen) and Leonard Joseph "L. J." Adelman, who were from North Dakota and worked as teachers and farmers. Adelman began his basketball career in high school at Pius X High School in Downey, CA, then matriculated to collegiate stardom at Loyola University of Los Angeles, now known as Loyola Marymount University. In the 1968 NBA draft, he was selected by the San Diego Rockets (now the Houston Rockets) in the 7th round. He played two seasons in San Diego before being taken by the expansion Trail Blazers in the 1970 expansion draft; he then played three seasons in Portland. He also played for the Chicago Bulls, New Orleans (now Utah) Jazz, and the Kansas City/Omaha (now Sacramento) Kings. He ended his playing career in 1975.

Coaching career

Chemeketa Community College
From 1977 through to 1983, Adelman coached at Chemeketa Community College in Salem, Oregon.

Portland Trail Blazers
He was then hired by the Portland Trail Blazers (then coached by Jack Ramsay) as an assistant. When Ramsay was fired and replaced with Mike Schuler in 1986, Adelman was retained; when Schuler was in turn fired during the 1988–89 season, Adelman was promoted to interim coach. After leading the team into the playoffs that year (despite a 39–43 record), Adelman was given the coaching position on a full-time basis in the 1989 off-season.

The next three years were quite successful for Adelman and the Trail Blazers; the team went to the NBA Finals in 1990 and 1992 (losing to the Detroit Pistons and the Chicago Bulls respectively) and went to the Western Conference finals in 1991 (losing to the Los Angeles Lakers). Adelman spent two more years with the team, but was dismissed after the 1993–1994 season.

Golden State Warriors
In 1995, Adelman was hired as the head coach of the Golden State Warriors. He was unable to duplicate his success in Portland, and was fired after only two years with the team.

Sacramento Kings
After a year's absence from the sidelines, Adelman was hired by the Sacramento Kings in 1998. Under Adelman's guidance, the Kings were one of the most successful teams in the Western Conference, qualifying for the playoffs every year of his Sacramento career.

During the Kings' 2000 playoff run, they met Phil Jackson's Los Angeles Lakers. Adelman questioned Jackson's motivational techniques when it was learned that Jackson compared Adelman to Adolf Hitler.

In 2002, the Kings made a serious run for the NBA Finals. After clinching the first seed in the competitive Western Conference, the Kings blazed through the opening two rounds but lost to the Lakers in a controversial series with noticeably lopsided officiating in favor of the Lakers.

In 2006, Adelman (in the final year of his contract) led the Kings to the playoffs. Despite the team struggling early in the regular season, the Kings rebounded and qualified for the playoffs as the #8 seed. Although competitive, they were defeated 4–2 by the defending champion San Antonio Spurs.  Adelman's contract with the Kings expired at the end of the 2005–2006 season. On May 9, it was reported by the Sacramento Bee that his contract would not be renewed. The Kings have yet to reach the playoffs - or post a winning record - since.

Houston Rockets
The Houston Rockets brought in Adelman as their new head coach five days after the dismissal of Jeff Van Gundy on May 18, 2007. Van Gundy had taken the Rockets to three playoff appearances in four years with no series victories. In his first season as head coach, Adelman guided the Rockets to a 22-game winning streak from January through March 2008, the third-longest winning streak in NBA history. However, they lost in the first round in six games.

In the 2009 season, the Rockets finished fifth in the West with a 53–29 record. They entered the playoffs without their star shooting guard, Tracy McGrady, due to an injury. Despite this loss, the Rockets defeated the Portland Trail Blazers in six games to advance to the Western Conference Semifinals for the first time since 1997. Although they would lose the series to the Los Angeles Lakers, they also proved their resilience by taking the series to seven games despite the loss of star center Yao Ming in Game 3 of that series.

Adelman won his 800th career game, 13th among coaches in NBA history, on March 24, 2008, against the Sacramento Kings.

On April 18, 2011, the Houston Chronicle reported that the Rockets would not give Adelman a new contract; Adelman and the team parted ways after four seasons and two playoff appearances.

Minnesota Timberwolves
On September 13, 2011, the Minnesota Timberwolves confirmed the hiring of Adelman as their new coach.

On April 6, 2013, Adelman won his 1,000th career game with a victory over the Detroit Pistons, becoming just the eighth coach in NBA history ever to do so.

On April 21, 2014, Adelman announced his retirement from coaching in the NBA. It was also announced that he would stay with the Timberwolves as a consultant. Adelman ranks ninth in terms of games coached and games won. He went 79–78 (.503) in playoff games and advanced to the NBA Finals twice, both times with the Portland Trail Blazers in 1990 and 1992 where they lost to the Detroit Pistons and Chicago Bulls.

Head coaching record

|-
| style="text-align:left;"|Portland
| style="text-align:left;"|
|35||14||21||.400|| style="text-align:center;"|5th in Pacific||3||0||3||.000
| style="text-align:center;"|Lost in First Round
|-
| style="text-align:left;"|Portland
| style="text-align:left;"|
|82||59||23||.720|| style="text-align:center;"|2nd in Pacific||21||12||9||.571
| style="text-align:center;"|Lost in NBA Finals
|-
| style="text-align:left;"|Portland
| style="text-align:left;"|
|82||63||19||.768|| style="text-align:center;"|1st in Pacific||16||9||7||.563
| style="text-align:center;"|Lost in Conf. Finals
|-
| style="text-align:left;"|Portland
| style="text-align:left;"|
|82||57||25||.695|| style="text-align:center;"|1st in Pacific||21||13||8||.619
| style="text-align:center;"|Lost in NBA Finals
|-
| style="text-align:left;"|Portland
| style="text-align:left;"|
|82||51||31||.622|| style="text-align:center;"|3rd in Pacific||4||1||3||.250
| style="text-align:center;"|Lost in First Round
|-
| style="text-align:left;"|Portland
| style="text-align:left;"|
|82||47||35||.573|| style="text-align:center;"|4th in Pacific||4||1||3||.250
| style="text-align:center;"|Lost in First Round
|-
| style="text-align:left;"|Golden State
| style="text-align:left;"|
|82||36||46||.439|| style="text-align:center;"|6th in Pacific||—||—||—||—
| style="text-align:center;"|Missed Playoffs
|-
| style="text-align:left;"|Golden State
| style="text-align:left;"|
|82||30||52||.366|| style="text-align:center;"|7th in Pacific||—||—||—||—
| style="text-align:center;"|Missed Playoffs
|-
| style="text-align:left;"|Sacramento
| style="text-align:left;"|
|50||27||23||.540|| style="text-align:center;"|3rd in Pacific||5||2||3||.400
| style="text-align:center;"|Lost in First Round
|-
| style="text-align:left;"|Sacramento
| style="text-align:left;"|
|82||44||38||.537|| style="text-align:center;"|5th in Pacific||5||2||3||.400
| style="text-align:center;"|Lost in First Round
|-
| style="text-align:left;"|Sacramento
| style="text-align:left;"|
|82||55||27||.671|| style="text-align:center;"|2nd in Pacific||8||3||5||.375
| style="text-align:center;"|Lost in Conf. Semifinals
|-
| style="text-align:left;"|Sacramento
| style="text-align:left;"|
|82||61||21||.744|| style="text-align:center;"|1st in Pacific||16||10||6||.625
| style="text-align:center;"|Lost in Conf. Finals
|-
| style="text-align:left;"|Sacramento
| style="text-align:left;"|
|82||59||23||.720|| style="text-align:center;"|1st in Pacific||12||7||5||.583
| style="text-align:center;"|Lost in Conf. Semifinals
|-
| style="text-align:left;"|Sacramento
| style="text-align:left;"|
|82||55||27||.671|| style="text-align:center;"|2nd in Pacific||12||7||5||.583
| style="text-align:center;"|Lost in Conf. Semifinals
|-
| style="text-align:left;"|Sacramento
| style="text-align:left;"|
|82||50||32||.610|| style="text-align:center;"|2nd in Pacific||5||1||4||.200
| style="text-align:center;"|Lost in First Round
|-
| style="text-align:left;"|Sacramento
| style="text-align:left;"|
|82||44||38||.537|| style="text-align:center;"|4th in Pacific||6||2||4||.333
| style="text-align:center;"|Lost in First Round
|-
| style="text-align:left;"|Houston
| style="text-align:left;"|
|82||55||27||.671|| style="text-align:center;"|3rd in Southwest||6||2||4||.333
| style="text-align:center;"|Lost in First Round
|-
| style="text-align:left;"|Houston
| style="text-align:left;"|
|82||53||29||.654|| style="text-align:center;"|2nd in Southwest||13||7||6||.538
| style="text-align:center;"|Lost in Conf. Semifinals
|-
| style="text-align:left;"|Houston
| style="text-align:left;"|
|82||42||40||.512|| style="text-align:center;"|3rd in Southwest||—||—||—||—
| style="text-align:center;"|Missed Playoffs
|-
| style="text-align:left;"|Houston
| style="text-align:left;"|
|82||43||39||.524|| style="text-align:center;"|5th in Southwest||—||—||—||—
| style="text-align:center;"|Missed Playoffs
|-
| style="text-align:left;"|Minnesota
| style="text-align:left;"|
|66||26||40||.394|| style="text-align:center;"|5th in Northwest||—||—||—||—
| style="text-align:center;"|Missed Playoffs
|-
| style="text-align:left;"|Minnesota
| style="text-align:left;"|
|82||31||51|||| style="text-align:center;"|5th in Northwest||—||—||—||—
| style="text-align:center;"|Missed Playoffs
|-
| style="text-align:left;"|Minnesota
| style="text-align:left;"|
|82||40||42|||| style="text-align:center;"|3rd in Northwest||—||—||—||—
| style="text-align:center;"|Missed Playoffs
|- class="sortbottom"
| align="center" colspan="2"|Career
|1,791||1,042||749|||| ||157||79||78||.503

Personal life
Adelman's son David Adelman is a professional basketball coach.

References

External links
 Profile as a player
 Profile as a coach

1946 births
Living people
American men's basketball coaches
American men's basketball players
Basketball coaches from California
Basketball players from California
Chicago Bulls players
Golden State Warriors head coaches
Guards (basketball)
Houston Rockets head coaches
Junior college men's basketball coaches in the United States
Kansas City Kings players
Los Angeles Stars draft picks
Loyola Marymount Lions men's basketball players
Minnesota Timberwolves head coaches
New Orleans Jazz players
People from Lynwood, California
Portland Trail Blazers assistant coaches
Portland Trail Blazers expansion draft picks
Portland Trail Blazers head coaches
Portland Trail Blazers players
Sacramento Kings head coaches
San Diego Rockets draft picks
San Diego Rockets players
Sportspeople from Downey, California